Jonathan Kenneth Butler (born 10 October 1961) is a South African singer-songwriter and guitarist. His music is often classified as R&B, jazz fusion or worship music.

Biography
Born and raised in Athlone, Cape Town, South Africa, during Apartheid, Butler started singing and playing acoustic guitar as a child. Racial segregation and poverty during Apartheid has been the subject of many of his records. His first single was the first by a black artist played by white radio stations in the racially segregated South Africa and earned a Sarie Award, South Africa's equivalent to the Grammy Awards.

He began touring at the age of seven when he joined a travelling stage show, and was later signed up to perform on a string of hit recordings, turning him into a local teen idol. In 1975, his cover of "Please Stay" by the Drifters reached number 2 in South Africa. The same year his cover of "I Love How You Love Me" by The Paris Sisters reached number 4. "I'll Be Home" reached number 16 in 1976.

In 1978, he found the inspiration and encouragement to begin expressing himself as a composer and songwriter when he joined Cape Town's best known jazz/rock outfit, the Pacific Express. Two albums were recorded with the Express personnel, and some Pacific Express songs were later released on the 1988 7th Avenue album. All three releases were issued by Mountain Records.

Butler was signed to CCP Records, a predecessor to Jive Records in 1977. He left the label to join Mountain Records after a few years. The manager of Mountain Records, Paddy Lee-Thorp was also Butler's manager and in the early 1980s they signed Jonathan to Jive Records and he moved to the United Kingdom, where he remained for seventeen years. His international breakthrough came in 1987 with his Grammy-nominated hit single, "Lies" which reached #27 on Billboard's Hot 100 chart, and his cover version of the Staple Singers song "If You're Ready (Come Go with Me)", which he performed with Ruby Turner. His single "Lies", also reached the UK Official Singles Chart, peaking at number 18, spending 12 weeks, in total, in the top 100.

In 2001, Butler was featured in a compilation album that was a jazz tribute to Bob Marley produced by Lee Ritenour, A Twist of Marley. Butler's contribution to the album was a jazz cover of No Woman No Cry.

Butler maintained a loyal following in the 1980s and 1990s, in South Africa, the United States and Europe.

In 2006, Butler was a featured vocalist on the album Gospel Goes Classical, produced by University of Alabama at Birmingham music professor Henry Panion. This recording, featuring arrangements by Panion, Tommy Stewart, Michael Loveless, and Ray Reach, rose to No. 2 on the Billboard Gospel chart, and No. 3 on the Classical Crossover chart. He was also nominated for a Grammy Award for his single "Going Home".

Also in 2008, Butler guest-starred on George Duke's Album Dukey Treats, alongside the late Teena Marie on the track Sudan, talking about the disasters of Darfur.

From 2005 to 2012 Butler lived in Bell Canyon, California,

Discography

Studio albums

Live albums
Live in South Africa (2007)

Compilation albums
Best of Jonathan Butler (1993)
Ultimate Butler (2002)
Christmas Goes Gospel: Tis the Season (2014)
Divine Voices: Pastors of Praise (2015)

Collaborations
Dave Grusin Presents West Side Story (1997) (Featured soloist - Maria)

Singles

References

External links

Official Website
 Radio interview with Jonathan Butler 'Part I' 'Part II' (Broadcast by NPR)
Early Days
Jonathan Butler at Discogs.

South African rhythm and blues musicians
South African jazz guitarists
South African male singer-songwriters
Smooth jazz guitarists
1961 births
Jive Records artists
Living people
Cape Coloureds
Musicians from Cape Town
Anti-apartheid activists
People from Bell Canyon, California